Trnovec ( or ) is a settlement in the hills northeast of Sevnica in east-central Slovenia. The area is part of the historical region of Styria. The Municipality of Sevnica is now included in the Lower Sava Statistical Region. 

The local church, built in the northern part of the settlement, is dedicated to Saint George and belongs to the Parish of Sevnica. It originally dates to the 14th century with surviving traces of the original Gothic frescos despite major rebuilding in the 17th century.

References

External links
Trnovec at Geopedia

Populated places in the Municipality of Sevnica